Arnaud Bühler (born 17 January 1985) is a Swiss football defender, who currently plays for FC Bavois. Bühler is a former youth international and was in the Swiss U-17 squad that won the 2002 U-17 European Championships.

Honours
Switzerland U-17
 UEFA U-17 European Champion: 2002

Sion
Swiss Cup: 2010–11

References

External links

Player profile FC Sion-Online

1985 births
Living people
Association football defenders
Swiss men's footballers
Switzerland youth international footballers
Switzerland under-21 international footballers
Swiss expatriate footballers
Swiss Super League players
Ligue 1 players
FC Lausanne-Sport players
FC Aarau players
FC Sochaux-Montbéliard players
FC Sion players
Szombathelyi Haladás footballers
FC Wil players
Expatriate footballers in France
Expatriate footballers in Hungary